János Panyik (born 25 October 1970) is a retired Hungarian biathlete. He competes in the Biathlon World Cup, and represents Hungary at the three Winter Olympic. His best result vas 10th place at the 1997 World Championships. This is the best Hungarian result ever in biathlon.

Biathlon results
All results are sourced from the International Biathlon Union.

Olympic Games

World Championships

*During Olympic seasons competitions are only held for those events not included in the Olympic program.
**Team was removed as an event in 1998, and pursuit was added in 1997 with mass start being added in 1999.
***In 1990 due to unconducive weather conditions during the season it was only possible to hold the individual competitions in Minsk. The sprints, the women's relay and team events were held in Oslo and the men's relay was finally held in Kontiolahti.
***In 1999 due to the cold, the individual and the mass start events were moved to Oslo, Norway.

References

1970 births
Living people
Hungarian male biathletes
Biathletes at the 1992 Winter Olympics
Biathletes at the 1994 Winter Olympics
Biathletes at the 1998 Winter Olympics
Olympic biathletes of Hungary
People from Gyöngyös
Sportspeople from Heves County
20th-century Hungarian people